The Gorillas (French: Les gorilles) is a 1964 French comedy film directed by Jean Girault and starring Darry Cowl, Francis Blanche and Bernard Dhéran. It was shot at the Billancourt Studios in Paris. The film's sets were designed by the art director Sydney Bettex.

Cast

 Darry Cowl as Edouard  
 Francis Blanche as Félix  
 Bernard Dhéran as Hubert Loisif  
 Michel Galabru as Le contractuel débutant  
 Jean Lefebvre as L'électro 
 Jess Hahn as Boris, Alexis Alexevitch, le maquilleur  
 Jean Le Poulain as Le metteur en scène  
 Patricia Viterbo as Claudine Carter  
 Maurice Chevit as Le premier contractuel  
 Clément Harari as Rha-Thé, l'indou magicien  
 Béatrice Altariba as Sylvie Danlevent  
 Pierre Doris as Le représentant en vins  
 Philippe Dumat as Frank Danlevent 
 Robert Dalban as Montecourt, l'entraîneur  
 Maria Pacôme as Josépha Dépelouze  
 Jacques Seiler as Le valet  
 Grégoire Aslan as Maître Lebavard  
 Maurice Garrel as La Lame  
 Maria-Rosa Rodriguez as Loetitia  
 Henri Virlojeux as Le second gardien à la Santé  
 Jean Carmet as La Fauche  
 Mario David as Bercy   
 Gérard Darrieu as Un complice de Lebavard  
 Jacques Famery 
 Guy Grosso as Un agent cycliste   
 Mitsouko 
 Michel Modo as Un agent cycliste  
 Paul Préboist as L'agent d'Orly  
 Pierre Tornade as Un agent de police  
 Henri Attal as La Tignasse    
 Willy Braque 
 Henri Cogan 
 Pierre Collet as Le premier gardien à la Santé  
 Michel Constantin as Otto, le légionnaire  
 Guy Delorme as Le Toulousain  
 Pierre Gummay as Franck  
 Rudy Lenoir as Lucien  
 Maryse Martin as La concierge  
 Michel Nastorg 
 Jean-Pierre Zola as Van Lédiam

References

Bibliography 
 Philippe Rège. Encyclopedia of French Film Directors, Volume 1. Scarecrow Press, 2009.

External links 
 

1964 films
French comedy films
1964 comedy films
1960s French-language films
Films directed by Jean Girault
1960s French films